Farhan Malik (born 25 February 1995) is a Canadian cricketer.

Career
On 22 August 2013, after leading the Canada under-19 side through the WICB U19 50-overs Championship, Malik was named the tournaments most valuable player. He was then part of the Canada under-19 side that participated in the 2014 Under-19 Cricket World Cup.

On 10 January 2015, Malik made his debut for the Canada senior cricket team against the Zimbabwe A side. He bowled for three overs, allowing twenty runs. Malik then made his Twenty20 debut for Canada during the 2015 ICC Americas Twenty20 Division One tournament against Bermuda. He bowled for three innings, allowing seventeen runs.

In May 2015, it was announced that Malik was assigned to join the Jamaica Tallawahs of the Caribbean Premier League.

On 3 June 2018, he was selected to play for the Toronto Nationals in the players' draft for the inaugural edition of the Global T20 Canada tournament.

References

External links
 ESPN CricInfo Profile.

1995 births
Living people
Canadian cricketers
People from Quetta
Canadian sportspeople of Pakistani descent